Michał Pietrzak (born 3 April 1989) is a retired Polish athlete who specialised in the 400 metres and 400 metres hurdles. He won two medals in the 4 × 400 metres relay at the European Athletics Championships.

Personal life 
Pietrzak was born on 3 April 1989 in Łęczyca. His parents, Waldemar and Jolanta, are both physical education teachers. He attended the Jerzy Kukuczka Academy of Physical Education in Katowice. In 2016, he completed his MA thesis in physical education.

Career 
Pietrzak competed in the 4 × 400 m relay event at the 2012 Summer Olympics in London. At the 2013 Indoor European Championships in Gothenburg, his team lost the relay bronze medal due to disqualification; it was judged that one of his teammates had pushed British athlete Richard Buck.

Competing in the 4 × 400 m relay, Pietrzak placed fourth at the 2014 World Indoor Championships in Sopot and took the bronze medal at the 2014 European Championships in Zürich. They won silver at the 2016 European Championships in Amsterdam. In 2016 Pietrzak ran the 400 m in 45.96.

He and his teammates qualified to the 4 × 400 metres relay final at the 2016 Summer Olympics in Rio de Janeiro, Brazil, finishing in 7th place.

Competition record

References

People from Łęczyca
Polish male sprinters
1989 births
Living people
Olympic athletes of Poland
Athletes (track and field) at the 2012 Summer Olympics
Athletes (track and field) at the 2016 Summer Olympics
Sportspeople from Łódź Voivodeship
World Athletics Championships athletes for Poland
European Athletics Championships medalists
Universiade medalists in athletics (track and field)
Universiade bronze medalists for Poland
Competitors at the 2017 Summer Universiade
Medalists at the 2015 Summer Universiade
21st-century Polish people